Demänovská Cave of Liberty (Slovak: Demänovská jaskyňa slobody) is a karst cave in Low Tatras, Slovakia. The cave was discovered in 1921, and, opened to the public in 1924. It is the most visited cave in Slovakia.

Cave bear bones were found in a passage now named Bear's Passage (Slovak: Medvedia chodba).

Large domes have been created with the largest being the Great Dome, which is 41m high, with a length of 75m and width of 35m.

See also
List of caves in Slovakia

References

External links

 Demänovská Cave of Liberty
 Demänovská Cave of Liberty at Slovakia travel

Show caves in Slovakia
Western Carpathians
Geography of Žilina Region
Tourist attractions in Žilina Region